This is a list of members of the 11th National People's Congress.

Constituency

References

National People's Congresses
National People's Congress members 11
 
11th